Katharine Reeves is an astronomer and solar physicist who works at the Center for Astrophysics  Harvard & Smithsonian (CfA).. She is known for her work on high temperature plasmas in the solar corona, and measurement/analysis techniques to probe the physics of magnetic reconnection and thermal energy transport during solar flares; these are aspects of the coronal heating problem that organizes a large part of the field.

Reeves has advised multiple graduate students and post-doctoral scholars in the field of solar physics, including Samaiyah Farid, Xie Xiaoyan, and Nishu Karna.

Education
B.A., Reed College
M.S., Northeastern University
Ph.D., University of New Hampshire

Awards and honors 
In 2016, Reeves was awarded the prestigious Karen Harvey Prize by the American Astronomical Society's Solar Physics Division, in recognition of her significant contributions to the study of the sun in her early career.

Publications 

Notable scientific publications include:
 
 Reeves, Katharine K.; Golub, Leon (2011-01-01). "Atmospheric Imaging Assembly Observations of Hot Flare Plasma". The Astrophysical Journal Letters 727 (2): L52. doi:10.1088/2041-8205/727/2/L52. ISSN 2041-8205.
 Reeves, Katharine K.; Linker, Jon A.; Mikić, Zoran; Forbes, Terry G. (2010-01-01). "Current Sheet Energetics, Flare Emissions, and Energy Partition in a Simulated Solar Eruption". The Astrophysical Journal 721(2): 1547. doi:10.1088/0004-637X/721/2/1547. ISSN 0004-637X.
 Reeves, Katharine K.; Moats, Stephanie J. (2010-01-01). "Relating Coronal Mass Ejection Kinematics and Thermal Energy Release to Flare Emissions using a Model of Solar Eruptions". The Astrophysical Journal 712(1): 429. doi:10.1088/0004-637X/712/1/429. ISSN 0004-637X.
 Reeves, K. K.; Guild, T. B.; Hughes, W. J.; Korreck, K. E.; Lin, J.; Raymond, J.; Savage, S.; Schwadron, N. A.; Spence, H. E. (2008-09-01)."Posteruptive phenomena in coronal mass ejections and substorms: Indicators of a universal process?". Journal of Geophysical Research: Space Physics 113 (A9): A00B02.doi:10.1029/2008JA013049. ISSN 2156-2202.
 Reeves, Seaton & Forbes, "Field Line Shrinkage in Flares Observed by the X-Ray Telescope on Hinode," ApJ, 675, 2008.
 Reeves, Warren & Forbes, "Theoretical Predictions of X-Ray and Extreme-UV Flare Emissions Using a Loss-of-Equilibrium Model of Solar Eruptions," ApJ, 668, 2007.

References 

Reed College alumni
American women astronomers
Living people
Year of birth missing (living people)
Northeastern University alumni
University of New Hampshire alumni
Harvard–Smithsonian Center for Astrophysics people
21st-century American astronomers
21st-century American women scientists